Callidrepana macnultyi is a moth in the family Drepanidae first described by Watson in 1965. It is found in the Central African Republic, the Democratic Republic of the Congo (Orientale) and Nigeria.

The length of the forewings is 10.5–12 mm for males and 17 mm for females. The forewing markings are brown. The proximal line of the antemedial fascia, the distal line of the postmedial fascia, the brown streak extending towards the apex from the cell, and a brown apical patch are all highly lustrous and there is a line of highly lustrous scales concolorous with the ground colour below the whole of the costa and in the cell from the base to the cell-spots. These are non-lustrous. The colour of the hindwing markings is as for the forewings. The distal line of the postmedial fascia is highly lustrous and there are some highly lustrous scales on the vestige of the proximal line of the antemedial fascia.

References

Moths described in 1965
Drepaninae